Jonti Picking, also known as Weebl, has created many Flash cartoons which are posted on the Internet. His best known cartoon, Weebl and Bob, once aired in short episodes on MTV. Other popular cartoons include Badgers and Catface. Picking has also created several interactive videogames.

Weebl and Bob

Weebl's most well-known Flash cartoon is Weebl and Bob. Created in June 2002, it became popular when noticed by MTV who broadcast short episodes on its cable channel.

The series revolves around two egg-like creatures called Weebl and Bob, who are best friends. They speak in a heavily mumbled manner almost indecipherable to the watcher; however, their speech is also shown in speech bubbles. The stories mainly concern the duo's many (failed) attempts to get around the characters simply staying on the spot and conversing, but often twists are added to the episodes, such as the parody of a-ha's Take on Me music video in the episode "Paper".

On The Moon

Beginning in 2005, this series of animations is the second most popular on the site, after Weebl and Bob. So far, twenty-three episodes have been produced, featuring the exploits of the Toast King and Insanity Prawn Boy, who both live on the Moon.

Badgers

Badgers or Badger Badger Badger was released on 2 September 2003. It consists of images of badgers doing calisthenics, a toadstool in front of a tree, and a snake in the desert. The cartoon loops indefinitely. The first two badger scenes contain twelve badgers; subsequent badger scenes contain eleven badgers. It has inspired numerous follow-ups and spoofs.

Cat Face

Cat Face is somewhat unusual, because it tells a continuous story over thirty episodes so far. It's written by Weebl's wife, Sarah Darling. The first 7 episodes are animated by Weebl whilst episodes 8 and onwards were mostly animated by Ben Smallman, aka Wonchop, though Weebl is still credited for the art.

The chief character is a white cat that has a very large head and continuously levitates.  His tiny body dangles beneath his enormous head at all times, and sways gently. Cat Face speaks with a French accent. Cat Face's attitude is dry, direct, cynical and freely critical, linked stereotypically with his accent.

Cat Face lives in a house with Box Cat, who dwells in a cardboard box and communicates in meowing that only Cat Face can understand. Cat Face also lives with a little old lady whom he took back to his home after she petted him.

At the beginning and end of each episode we hear from a narrator, who provides the context of each episode and also concludes each part by saying "Silly Cat Face!" in response to a blunder or error committed by Cat Face. After this, Cat Face re-appears on screen to offer a brief moral lesson for any 'kids' who may be watching. This pattern has been broken only twice, once when "Silly Box Cat" was written and Cat Face chastised the narrator, and once when "Silly Old Lady" was written, and Old Lady herself appeared in place of Cat Face.

Children are sometimes seen waving and cheering at Cat Face, despite him chiding and ordering them to go to school. This suggests that the Cat Face series is a satire of children's television.

In the Prawn to be Wild game series found on the website, Cat Face appears in parts 5 and 6.  At the end of part 5, he captures the protagonist, Insanity Prawn Boy, and imprisons him in the same room as the rest of his 'special things'.  In part 6, the player must find a way to escape from Cat Face's house.

In an interview with NME magazine, it was revealed that Cat Face was inspired by Jonti Picking's cats Logi and Peanut, who died in 2008, and supposedly "speak exactly like Cat Face".  Episode 10 was dedicated to Picking's tortoiseshell cat Peanut, who died of cancer prior to the episode's release.

Other series

Magical Trevor 
Magical Trevor is a series of short musical Flash cartoons created by Jonti Picking. These cartoons are showcased on the Weebl's stuff website. As of October 2009, Magical Trevor had been viewed approximately 11 million times on the official website. The first one was broadcast on Nickelodeon's Nicktoons during the Nicktoons Film Festival in 2005.

As of 2006, Weebl had no plans to make a Magical Trevor 5, due to poor reviews of Magical Trevor 4. However, in August 2014, Weebl announced plans to create a Kickstarter campaign to raise funds for a Magical Trevor series of 11 minute episodes.

Since 2009 the Magical Trevor theme and artwork is used in Yell Group advertisements. Trevor himself features in one scene.

On April 24, 2020, Magical Trevor 5 was released.

Kenya 
Kenya is a series of animations based on the different countries of the world. They all follow a tune and are on a continuous loop. The first toon, "Kenya", has become one of the most popular toons on Weebl's Stuff.

The movie features an upbeat song comparing Kenya favorably to Norway as a tourist destination, pointing out various attractions that are available "only in Kenya". The cartoon begins with a lion with no visible mouth in front of a multi-colored ground.  The lion dances in an odd manner by swinging his bulbous spherical 'arms' and alternating the feet he is standing on. The words "Only Available in Kenya" flash briefly above the lion. The scene pans to the left to reveal a tiger in the same foreground, who unlike the preceding lion, has whiskers and a mouth but lacks the lion's mane (tigers are native to Asia). The tiger dances in the same way as the lion and shares a common orange color with him.

After a few moments, the scene zooms out, showing both lion and tiger in the same shot. "Amazing Offer!!" declares a flashing caption above them. "Lions and Tigers available for viewing now!"

The scene quickly switches to a small, red map of Norway, with text on the side stating that Norway's population is crab, that it has no tigers or lions, and that its main export is tree (Norway's actual primary export is petroleum). Below this more text declares that "TREE<LIONS==KENYA WINS". It also claims that Norway should be called Snoreway. A new map replaces it shortly afterward, showing the African continent with certain countries colored in and a protruding Kenya. The 3D Kenya moves up and down with the music as an orange dotted line extending from it shows, according to text at the side, the line to ensure the best coverage if Kenya were to urinate all over Norway physically, as well as metaphorically (however, as noted, this is a rare occurrence).
The tiger is then shown dancing on a giraffe as the lion, apparently unsuccessfully trying to eat the giraffe, is clamped onto the giraffe's leg with his teeth. The lion and tiger then dance in place, each holding a knife and fork, over an apparently dead zebra while the words "Hurry! Only available while stocks last!" flash above. Then a multicolored map of Kenya shows a few facts about the country and a tiger and two lions dance on the map. The next scene shows three people, two of whom play vuvuzelas and one waving his arms in glee, leaning out of the windows of a bus labeled "Holy crap. Lions! Tours". The cartoon ends with the words "Kenya Believe it! Free snorkel with every visit" on a red background. As of October 2007, Kenya has been viewed 10 million times on the Weebls Stuff website, more than any other Weebls toon.

Variations 
A Christmas themed version, called Lapland, shows Santa Claus and a snowflake in place of the lion and the tiger, and is set in Lapland. As one cannot make a humorous pun out of the word Lapland as one can with Kenya, the singer notes that there is "not much to do there, but still better than Norway" in the place of "Kenya Believe it". Despite this, the cartoon notes that Lapland is itself a better tourist destination than Norway. (In fact, parts of Lapland are in Norway. It also overlaps with Sweden, Finland and Russia. The map the cartoon uses for Lapland is of the Kola Peninsula while the statistics for Lapland are for the Finnish province of Lappi.) In one part of this cartoon it is also stated "If you wanted to open a strip club, Lapland would be a possible name".

In 2008 a version making light of the recent pirating in Somalia was created. It has the same tune as Kenya and compares the pirates of Somalia favorably against Long John, which was suggested should be named "Small Dong" and that he is being deported to Norway. The tour boat also reads "Pie-Ass Tours", a reference to the arcade game "Pirates!" by Nix, parodied for its pronunciation of the title.

Brazil is a looped song similar to Kenya. This toon also jokingly mocks Norway, specifically the way that Norwegians dance. The song mainly focuses on the aspects of Brazil like football and also make several plays on the word bra.

Mr. Stabby

Mr Stabby was another popular cartoon, created by Jonti Picking and Joel Veitch.   The animation features a strange, knife-wielding maniac with ginger hair and beard who uses sharp weaponry to help him in his everyday life. All toons are accompanied by ironic soothing music.

Parsley Boobs
Parsley Boobs is a series of flash animations. Strangely, it has nothing to do with parsley or breasts - although the main characters Carl Honduras and Minky Steve both resemble circumcised phalluses. Currently five episodes have been put online. The series revolves around Carl Honduras and Minky Steve, two people whose society is held together by the '9 o'clock Fork'; a picture of a fork broadcast on TV. However, when they travel in time and accidentally kill the inventor of the fork their society is ruined and they try to prevent it from happening. His time machine is a heavily armed tank called the 'Time Crapper', when he travels through time he "kicks time's arse" by shooting everything at the time vortex... this somehow has not altered history. In episode three he is revealed to have amblyopia and can not stand bright light, in which he cowers and hisses like a vampire. Minky Steve is the other co-presenter of the '9 o'clock Fork', who has a high voice, is androgynous and is only ever wearing a vest and blue short shorts. Minky's time machine is a giant pink, apparently marsupial bunny who when not in use eats big carrots. Minky thinks "Time traveling is faaaaaaabulous!," and has a habit of yelling "Brilliant!" in a loud high pitched voice.

Lardman
Lardman (born Aaron Nicholas Williams) is a small creature that is simply a lump of lard with eyes and stick figure legs, who has appeared in 2 cartoons and a short made for Picking's 2004 animated advent calendar for Samsung. The main plotline of the cartoons are to prove that his life is an "exciting adventure", but the cartoons focus instead on the title character's uninteresting moments.

The Lord
The Lord is a series of toons on Weebl's Stuff that depicts an upper-class man named Lord Peter Feathering-Walthamstones who acknowledges his viewers and each episode, attempts to show them his drawing room but cannot (usually because of drug related reasons). These toons are unique as they give the effect of a black-and-white 1940s documentary.

8 Bit Pwny Club
An episodic video game show in which the three 8-bit styled characters look at various Top 5 categories such as 'Best Toilets' and 'Unhealthiest Power-ups'.  The hosts are Daze, a parody of Dizzy, Spader, a senile and perverted space invader, and Cookie, a more girlish version of Samus Aran. The third episode had them pick their favourite game of the decade, which all turned out to be Half-Life 2. A recurring appearance is the Shrooms band, which have also appeared in a separate toon. The series is written by Weebl and Joel Jessup and animated by Weebl and Wonchop.

Single toons 
 Narwhals Narwhals is a looped animated music video, much like Weebl's earlier work "Scampi", and is animated by Wonchop. This music video is about the narwhal, and, throughout the song, a list of "facts" are presented as to why narwhals are awesome. They are variously described as being, among other things, "the Jedi of the sea" and "inventors of the Shish Kebab". This is accompanied by claims that narwhals could "beat a polar bear in a fight" or that they can "stop Cthulhu eating ye", with a warning to not allow narwhals to make contact with one's testicles.  In 2015 Sprint used the first part of this video as part of an advertising campaign.  On 4 June 2018, part of the lyrics of Narwhals was recited in the House of Commons of the United Kingdom by Alex Sobel MP during debate on the Ivory Bill.

 Giraffe The story displayed in giraffe is that of a man who has not been able to sleep due to the loud stomping of a giraffe that has taken up residence in his loft. The man then proceeds to kick the giraffe out of his house, giving the excuse that the roof space was quite low anyway. Within an hour the giraffe has re-entered the man's house, along with three elephant friends. The giraffe is accused of wearing the chimney of the house as a scarf and then laughing at the man's misfortune.

 Demolition Squid Demolition Squid is a trailer for a movie that is "based on a true story" and features "the motion captured performance of Tom Hanks" (referencing the movie The Polar Express, which was released shortly before this cartoon). In the movie, a squid wearing a hard hat uses demolition equipment to defeat his enemies. For example, he "[has] to destroy the orphanage before Hitler Baby can escape" and uses a wrecking ball to demolish the orphanage. He also blows up a woman's house, perceiving it as a threat. We find out at the end of the trailer that the buildings are in fact dangerous when a bank rises up off the ground and is revealed to be a monster. Demolition Squid's frequently-used catchphrase is "Oh, Shiiiiiiiit!". Demolition Squid is an obvious parody of the over-the-top action movie trailers which feature an exaggeratedly deep-voiced narrator and cheesy catchphrases or oneliners. The subtitle for the movie is "Calamari Democracy", a reference to the video game Katamari Damacy.

 aaaaaaaaaaaaahaha Released April 5, 2005 as a joke, at the time there had not been a recent video of decent length. News articles posted on the site claimed the staff had been working on an amazing short. This video was claimed to be that amazing animation, much to everyone's surprise. However, the real animation was Demolition Squid. The short blurb that accompanies each of Weebl's toons simply reads "aaaaaaaaaahahaha haaaaaaaaaaaaaaaaaa. ahahahaaah ahhhh aaaah." aaaaaaaaaaaaahaha features what appears to be an anthropomorphic strip of bacon dancing along with a naked humanoid creature lacking the top part of a skull with a spoon embedded in its brain. The exclamation "aaaaaaaaaaaaahaha", described as a cross between a scream and a laugh, is heard in the background with a simple tune. Like many of Weebl's toons, this one loops.

 Patrick Moore (Plays the Xylophone) A paean to British astronomer and national treasure, Sir Patrick Moore. The animation shows him flying through space to play on his xylophone for some dancing Martians. B3ta founder Rob Manuel had the idea behind this cartoon. (Note that Sir Patrick Moore could actually play the xylophone, until arthritis made it impossible.)

 Breadfish The movie Breadfish features a single underwater scene of fish embedded in loaves of bread drifting past the viewer, and is representative of the many minor cartoons on the site.  It too has looping music (describing the marvelous breadfish as an "inverse sandwich, for fishermen and sharks), but the loop is much shorter than those for the most famous cartoons. It is also reminiscent of the After Dark "flying toaster" screen savers. As of November 2006, Breadfish has been viewed 1.96 million times on the official website, and possibly many more on other sites.  The cartoon has generated much controversy in online forums over whether the lyrics refer to a "marvelous breadfish" or a "motherless breadfish". The latter name, which is largely believed to be a misunderstanding of the lyrics, is often the preferred understanding of the lyrics, causing disappointment to those who learn the breadfish are "marvelous" instead of "motherless". It has even been the namesake of at least one trivia team.
Lyrics:Tell me, have you seen the marvelous Breadfish; Swimming in the ocean waters; Have you seen the marvelous Breadfish; It's like an inverse sandwich; An awe for fisherman and sharks.

 Scampi The movie Scampi features a purposefully marching man in military garb singing 'I've seen things, I've seen them with my eyes; I've seen things, they're often in disguise', then naming various items such as carrots, handbags, cheese, toilets,  Russians, planets, hamsters, weddings, poets, Stalin, Kuala Lumpur, pygmies and budgies.  An image of each (in its appropriate disguise) is given as it is named; the focal item is the city of Kuala Lumpur, whose image is a map of Malaysia on which the city has been re-labelled "France" to spoof a Simpsons episode.  As with other cartoons on the site, the action is set to looping music. The loop goes out of sync with the music after a while. A "remix" was added later, which features identical audio but more detailed animation. In this version,the soldier wore red and Kuala Lumpur is first disguised as Florida and then a koala, and the pygmy and budgie are sinister, blowing the soldier to pieces with rocket launchers on the second'I've seen things, I've seen them with my eyes; I've seen things, they're often in disguise',to which a box, marked "One Marching Soldier", produces yet another soldier to repeat the cycle.

As of July 2007, Scampi has been viewed 4.95 million times on the official website, and possibly many more on other sites.

 Dugong The Movie Dugong is based on the mammal of the same name, and features dugongs wearing top hats. It mentions that it is "The cow of the sea", where a cow from the first Magical Trevor cameos. It also mentions that it is "also known as the manatee"; and that it "doesn't have wings (because that is silly)"; nor does it live in a tree, for the same reason. It also notes that "compared to the dolphin (its very close cousin), it's quite ugly".  Actually, dugongs are closer relatives to afrotheres, especially elephants.  Also, dugongs and manatees are completely different species.  Dugongs are part of the family Dugonginae (along with the extinct Steller's sea cow), while manatees are part of the family Trichechidae.

 ChutneyThe animation Chutney is a somewhat haphazard Weebl toon, which starts with a skydiver leaping from an airplane proclaiming "Urine!" A fellow skydiver pulls alongside and corrects him, saying "I think you mean 'wee!'". The first skydiver argues that he "is a big boy now" right before they land on a cloud. The cloud reveals a face and says "BOOM!" in a high-pitched voice. The second skydiver pokes his head above the cloud and into viewing range. "Did this cloud just speak?" he inquires, mere moments before the cloud detonates, killing both men. The cartoon continues with an English lord-like character and a stereotypical Frenchman called Passepartout on board a hot air balloon that descends into the frame. (this is possibly a reference to a scene in the 1956 film Around the World in 80 Days) The English character says "Look at them, they're all dead!" and proceeds to laugh to the point of breathlessness at the skydivers' misfortune. He catches his breath and requests that the Frenchman give him some more tea. The Frenchman tells him that they have run out, and the angry Englishman expresses his disgust with the Frenchman. The Frenchman "judo kicks" the Englishman at his rude remark. He is ejected from the hot air balloon to the Frenchman's angry cry of "That is for ABBA!", implying that the band are English. Although the Englishman is falling to his death, he swiftly and calmly replies, "They were Swedish!" The Frenchman rolls up his sleeves and journeys to Sweden to fight because of his hatred of the pop group, and is told to join a queue. The animation cuts to two more characters waiting in a line. One queries if this is the line for fighting, and the other (looking above news newspaper entitled "poo") replies, "No, this is the line for chutney!" The song of the animation begins and we hear of how chutney is a tasty addition to papadums or one's main course. The main chorus involves chants of "Chutney!" with large spinning heads - Jonti Picking's own - acting as background singers. Early in the song, we see the Englishman from the hot air balloon finally fall to the ground, where he is later taken away by an ambulance.

 Bonjour The animation starts with an animated cartoon phallic Frenchman (obvious since he's wearing a beret as well as a striped shirt) singing "Bonjour, monsieur" over and over again, standing in front of five trees. The music is a simple and uplifting beat with a rapid bass-line. After the Frenchman has sung his tune for a bit, all the while disappearing and reappearing all over the scenery, he disappears and instead a cartoon-version of Elvis appears singing about how he wants some "underpants" and later about the apparent lack of underpants in France, all the while lamenting that lack of underpants in said country. He then reminds the viewer to bring underpants if the viewer ever goes to France. He then disappears and is replaced by the earlier Frenchman singing the chorus, who is also joined by a bird-like creature sitting in one of the trees and singing a high-pitched harmony. For the grand finale the Frenchman shows that he's not wearing any pants at all, neither is he wearing trousers, in fact he's dangling a cartoon penis in rhythm with the music and singing the same verse as the Elvis-like character from before (as the bird watches in horror) but claims in the end that "No one in France needs the underpants!". Also, the sky has been replaced with the French flag.

 Crabs The Crabs animation concerns a bag full of crabs and man who puts all of said crabs in his mouth. He then proceeds to run around town, bleeding profusely, gathering much attention from the locals. During the scat singing section of the song, he begins jumping around to the beat of the music, splattering blood on the ground with each landing. At the end, he remarks "That's how I'll sound with a mouthful of crabs." The music is somewhat different from other Weebl songs, as it has a strong reggae/ska influence in comparison to the usual electro-pop songs of the other cartoons. There is also a version of the Crabs song using the same soundtrack, using Garry's Mod for Half-Life 2. This version uses the Headcrab, Dr. Isaac Kleiner and Civil Protection models and the map cs_italy from Counter-Strike: Source. The events in this version are almost identical to the original. This version has been converted into flash for adding to the official site by Jonti, with the only differences being that it loops and sound effects (collision on walls) are removed.

 MangoThis toon begins with the female narrator's voice, starting out in a story-book fashion, saying "Once upon a time, in a far off land, there lived a-", followed by the start of the looping portion of the song. The screen shows mangoes running, jumping, flipping, and generally acting as if they're happy to be mangoes.  The action then moves on to a ship, where a pirate is harassing a captain for "his booty".

 Cucumbers This is a song which begins stating that they are going to Bognor Regis because they have heard Bognor Regis is panda free. So they can plant cucumbers because pandas are the cucumber's enemy. It then states that the only way for a cucumber to escape a panda is by driving a go-kart down the street.

 Owls This animation loop begins by stating that everyone is fond of owls, except for  mice and shrews (and Simon Cowell). It continues with several threats to Simon Cowell as the owls hunt him, then "exposes" him as the "King of the Beavers", suggesting a grand conflict between owls and beavers.

 Annoying This toon simply features a deranged looking person, dressed in a pink shirt and underpants, dancing manically to a song that goes "Oh my word, this tune is annoying, yes I know, It's really annoying, I can't get this song out of my head. Make it stop this tune is annoying, I gotta go to work in the morning, now I'm gonna be hummin' it in my bed," parodying the catchiness of Weebl's songs. Like many of the site's toons, it plays in an infinite loop. The notes listed under "Credits" underneath the animation state "Quicky to pass the time till Magical Trevor 2 is finished."

 Blimp A looping toon about a man riding a blimp, proclaiming that "everybody needs to get a blimp, 'cause blimps are pretty pimp". It then goes on to explain how helium is better suited to filling blimps than various other gases. Finally, Godzilla (who makes a cameo appearance) advises against inhaling helium, despite its aforementioned properties.

 Amazing HorseA man in Victorian dress, riding a horse, approaches a woman by a river and tells her all about his horse, including how it turns into a plane when its mane is stroked, and reverts into a horse when its "winkie" is pulled, offending the woman. Noticing her offense, he notes that it would not be wise if he showed her where lemonade is made. He offers to take her "around the universe and all the other places too" to which the woman points out that the universe is technically everything. Then, due to his apparent disregard for her statement, the man (in a stern manner) tells her to stop talking and get on his horse. There have been several versions of various genres produced, as well as a jazz version made by Weebl and a heavy metal cover by Tommy Johansson. Weebl later extended his song, adding more, albeit similar lyrics. In the new verse the man talks about his horse's bulletproof hooves and purple scrotum, brought about by "custom stylings" and a "two-tone paint job". The extended version of the song is available in the Rock Band Network in Rock Band 3.

 Shrooms A four-man heavy metal band of pixellated mushrooms parodying various forms of metal, detailing the various objects they can grow on and sneaking into a man's house to grow in the fridge, then chasing out the man with a giant knife. An extended version of a segment from 8 Bit Pwny Club 2.

 Waffles This animation loop, created by Peabo, extols the virtues of waffles, both the Belgian and potato varieties, and suggests they were invented by Gandhi. It includes imagery from Child's Play and Pulp Fiction. It also briefly shows two waffles having intercourse, so this particular toon is especially not for children.

Scotch Egg This movie opens with three Scotch Eggs bouncing up and down. The video tells us that "it's the egg from Scotland", and tells us more about their virtues. Later, it is told that the Scotch egg was actually invented in London in 1851 by the shop Fortnum & Mason, and then a real Scottish egg comes along and squashes the "false" Scotch Egg with its fist.

Moustaches This animation loop features a man repeating the word moustaches four times before an underdressed female starts singing about a large variety of different moustaches including Mexican, foo manchu, handlebar, horseshoe, pencil, toothbrush, walrus and dalí. She then alerts us to the fact that she wants to touch them, followed by the man exclaiming about a moustache's ability to add class to anyone who is lucky enough to have one. Following this the song changes from light rock to heavy rock with the addition of lead guitar played by the man as he yells about the laser's ability to cut his moustaches and how people should avert their gazes as to not hurt their eyes. He then insults a man with a beard and notifies him that he is inferior. The song finishes with a repeat of the above apart from the last 2 lines in which he draws attention to the fact that a moustache is in some ways a sex magnet.

Russian Dancing Men
A video animated by Peabo revolving around a group of dancing Russians who do various things, mostly boogying. An iOS music video game based on the animation, which features various other Weebl's Stuff songs and gameplay similar to Vib Ribbon, was released on the App Store on October 28, 2011.

An animated series focused on the Russian Dancing Men began on April 22, 2014, with the first episode, Winter Olympics, being animated by Anthony Price/Kr3id.

Armadillo At the start of this video, several armadillos are shown jumping up and down. A duck points to one of them, pointing out that he's filling pillows with potpourri and selling them by the side of the road. The duck approaches the armadillo and inquires as to whether he has a business license, to which the armadillo replies that no, he does not. The duck is not surprised, and warns the armadillo that he should be careful if he doesn't want to pay a fine. The duck then notices that when a nine-banded armadillo is startled (as one might be upon hearing this), it will jump, often resulting in traffic-related fatalities. He proceeds to scare three different armadillos, leading to three such incidents. He then does the same to TV show host Dr. Phil, who he had apparently mistaken for another armadillo, and expresses displeasure at his mistake.

Potato
A video animation of three potatoes repeating the phrase "Potato, Potato, Potato". Two of them are dancing in the foreground, while the third one is on a hopping back and forth on pogo stick in the background. One of the potato gets chopped, and then screams "Chips" to declare his new form.

Games and Interactive 
 Moon War Based on an old 'BASIC' game, this one player or multiplayer game requires the user to enter an angle and power with which to fire their cannon with the intention of hitting the other players cannon on the other side of the moon. The variable terrain varies between each level to add variance.

 Prismatic This Weebl's-stuff game requires the player to click a small red dot bouncing around the screen and over large coloured circles. If the player misses the dot and clicks any part of a sphere by accident a life is lost. As levels progress more and more larger circles are present on the screen and the dot moves faster making it more difficult to click the dot without missing.

 Ultimate Pie Theft In this Pac-Man tribute you, the gamer, must guide the Wee Bull around several levels of mazes eating the pie. As in Pac-Man, you are chased around the maze.  But instead of ghosts Wee Bull is pursued by Weebl, Bob, Hairy Lee & Chris the Ninja Pirate. Whenever the fruit appeared it is announced by Derek the monkey though his face never appears.

 Dog Fight This Weebl's Stuff multiplayer game requires the gamer to fight it out in a "classic" dogfight style game against another Weebl's stuff visitor.

 Towel Boy This is a spin-off of the classic snake game. Guide your Towel Boy around the board picking up the ladies, who follow on behind. This was a game originally made by the Weebl's Stuff team for Lynx.

 Goodbye Steve The Steve Irwin Memorial Soundboard is a collection of Steve's greatest quotes - namely each button on the soundboard playing Irwin's catchphrase "Crikey!". The last button however plays a clip of Irwin saying "Croc poo!" and makes the crocodile in Irwin's hands defecate. Released 6 September 2006.

 Pumpkin Panic Fight the nasty pumpkin invasion in this game by Peabo and The Booboo. Released on 30 October 2006, Halloween. Halfway through the second level, the pumpkins form the words "MMM...PIE", a reference to Weebl and Bob

 Rock Paper Scissors The classic rock paper scissors game. The site has a single player and a multiplayer version.

 Prawn To be wild A weekly 12 part point-and-click adventure game sponsored by T-mobile and starring Insanity Prawn Boy. It is set before the crustacean moves to the moon and reveals some of his back story to the player. Some of the episodes have Insanity Prawn Boy meeting with other Weebl characters such as Weebl and Bob and Catface. The episodes are uploaded onto the site every Friday as part of T-Mobile's 'Top up Friday' campaign.

 Fanta Dash and Fanta Factory Defender Made for Fanta, alongside the Jimmy Two Hats cartoons, these games focus on protecting Fanta, the self-proclaimed most fun drink in the world, from the Fun Police. Fanta Dash sees the Evil Ruler of the Hades Cluster riding a comically large bottle of Fanta to recover Fanta from the Fun Police, that can then be used as a boost for gaining further distance. Factory Defender involves setting up cannons around a path to the Fanta Factory to protect it from attack by the Fun Police.

 That Dam Game Based on a winning idea by Noah Wentworth for the Science and Maths competition, That Dam Game involves a farm boy picking up anything he can find to launch from a catapult, in order to push in a giant cork in a dam in order to stop the town being flooded, with scores based on how long the player lasts. Bonus time is awarded for repeated success with certain items (i.e. getting a lot of successful hits with a cow earns you the "Cow Master" bonus.)

References

External links
Weebl's Stuff
Weebl's Stuff website formatted for PSP viewing on a PSP

 
Lists of flash cartoon episodes
Weebl